Shubb is a company that specialises in producing capos for all kinds of stringed instruments. The company was formed in 1974 by banjoists Rick Shubb and Dave Coontz. Shubb capos remain a top-selling capo forty years after their invention. Shubb wanted to create a capo that would not make his instrument go out of tune, which has resulted in ongoing efforts to refine his invention. Since 2016 at least 80% of Shubb's Capos are manufactured in China.

Capo design
The Shubb Capo utilises an over-centre locking action, which is lever operated. The design includes a screw for adjusting the clamp's tightness, and has been described as "a turning point in modern capo design."

Shubb capos are available in variety of models to fit different types of guitars, banjos, dobros, and ukuleles. For example, there are Shubb Capos for Steel String Guitar which fit most acoustic and electric guitars; the Shubb Capos for Nylon String Guitar are designed for guitars with wide flat fretboards, etc. Furthermore, each model is available in different styles, namely Original (nickel-plated or plain, unplated brass), Capo Noir (black chrome) and Deluxe (stainless steel with improved roller design on the lever).

The Shubb capo was introduced at the 1980 NAMM Show, and became a favorite on the Usenet acoustic guitar newsgroup.

An advantage with using this type of capo is that it does not change the intonation in a way that makes the instrument difficult to tune, as it "mimics the grip of a human hand." A disadvantage is that the rubber sleeve may wear, and may need to be replaced.

The Shubb partial capos can be useful for playing fingerstyle guitar and for playing in alternate tunings.

The Shubb capo was featured in the 2007 Acoustic Guitar magazine's Player's Choice awards.

Notable Shubb capo users
Notable users of the Shub capo include:
 Brian Setzer
 Keith Richards
 Pete Seeger
 Jerry Garcia
 Bruce Springsteen
 Doc Watson

See also 
Capo

References

External links
A Careful Comparison of Shubb, Kyser Esus (3-string) Partial Capos, by Harvey Reid
Intonation, A capo's greatest challenge, Shubb Official Website
Official Shubb Website
Rick Shubb Interview NAMM Oral History Library (2010)
Dave Coontz Interview NAMM Oral History Library (2014)

Companies based in Sonoma County, California
Design companies established in 1974
Musical instrument manufacturing companies of the United States
1974 establishments in California
Guitar parts and accessories
Manufacturing companies established in 1974